Moraea virgata is a plant species in the family Iridaceae.

References

virgata
Taxa named by Nikolaus Joseph von Jacquin